Abdul Razaq (born 21 February 2000) is an Afghan cricketer. He made his first-class debut for Kunduz Province in the 2018–19 Mirwais Nika Provincial 3-Day tournament on 20 February 2019. He made his List A debut for Balkh Province in the 2019 Afghanistan Provincial Challenge Cup tournament on 1 August 2019.

References

External links
 

2000 births
Living people
Afghan cricketers
Place of birth missing (living people)